Austere is an EP by Sparta, released in 2002 on DreamWorks Records. Their first record, it was released one year after the break-up of At the Drive-In.

All of the songs were re-recorded for Sparta's debut album Wiretap Scars, however "Vacant Skies" appeared on the UK version of the album as a bonus track. It also appeared on the compilation album Dragging the Lake II, released by Atticus clothing company. It was recorded at Rosewood Studios in El Paso, Texas by Mike Major.

Track listing
"Mye" – 3:33
"Cataract" – 5:09
"Vacant Skies" – 3:32
"Echodyne Harmonic (de-mix)" – 3:50

Personnel
Dave Shirk – mastering
Sparta – engineer, main performer
Mike Major – producer, engineer, mixing
Gabriel el Chino Gonzalez – assistant

Charts

References

2002 EPs
Sparta (band) albums
DreamWorks Records EPs